Ashley Billington (born 16 January 1969) is a former Hong Kong rugby union international. He represented Hong Kong from 1992 to 1999.

Rugby union career
Billington made his international debut on 23 October 1992 at Dubai International Sevens.
Of the matches, he played for his national side he was on the winning side on many occasions.

He played his final XVs match for Hong Kong on 31 October 1998 at Jalan Besar Stadium in the Hong Kong vs Japan match. In 1994 he scored a world record 50 points (10 tries) in a single match against Singapore in a Rugby World Cup Qualifier.

After his rugby days had passed, he taught at Hong Kong International School as a P.E. Instructor. Ashley is still teaching at HKIS, an international school in Hong Kong, as of 2020.

References

1969 births
Hong Kong rugby union players
Hong Kong international rugby union players
Rugby union wings
Loughborough Students RUFC players
Alumni of Loughborough University
Living people